William Spencer (July 30, 1900 – July 14, 1983) was an American middle-distance runner. He competed in the men's 1500 metres at the 1924 Summer Olympics.

References

External links
 

1900 births
1983 deaths
Athletes (track and field) at the 1924 Summer Olympics
Athletes (track and field) at the 1928 Summer Olympics
American male middle-distance runners
American male steeplechase runners
Olympic track and field athletes of the United States
People from Jackson, Tennessee
Track and field athletes from Tennessee